The 1901 Brooklyn Superbas lost several players to the newly official major league, the American League, and fell to third place.

Offseason 
 February 1901: Gene DeMontreville was purchased from the Superbas by the Boston Beaneaters.

Regular season

Season standings

Record vs. opponents

Notable transactions 
 June 17, 1901: Cozy Dolan was purchased by the Superbas from the Chicago Orphans.
 June 19, 1901: Lefty Davis was released by the Superbas.
 June 20, 1901: Hughie Jennings was purchased from the Superbas by the Philadelphia Phillies.

Roster

Player stats

Batting

Starters by position 
Note: Pos = Position; G = Games played; AB = At bats; R = Runs; H = Hits; Avg. = Batting average; HR = Home runs; RBI = Runs batted in; SB = Stolen bases

Other batters 
Note: G = Games played; AB = At bats; R = Runs; H = Hits; Avg. = Batting average; HR = Home runs; RBI = Runs batted in; SB = Stolen bases

Pitching

Starting pitchers 
Note: G = Games pitched; GS = Games started; CG = Complete games; IP = Innings pitched; W = Wins; L = Losses; ERA = Earned run average; BB = Bases on balls; SO = Strikeouts

Other pitchers 
Note: G = Games pitched; GS = Games started; CG = Complete games; IP = Innings pitched; W = Wins; L = Losses; ERA = Earned run average; BB = Bases on balls; SO = Strikeouts

Relief pitchers 
Note: G = Games pitched; IP = Innings pitched; W = Wins; L = Losses; SV = Saves; ERA = Earned run average; BB = Bases on balls; SO = Strikeouts

References

External links
Baseball-Reference season page
Baseball Almanac season page
1901 Brooklyn Superbas uniform
Brooklyn Dodgers reference site
Acme Dodgers page 
Retrosheet
1901 Brooklyn Superbas historical game recaps at www.chronicledbaseball.com

Los Angeles Dodgers seasons
Brooklyn Superbas season
Brook
1900s in Brooklyn
Park Slope